Umal Nineveh Sport Club, is an Iraqi football team based in Nineveh, that plays in Iraq Division Two.

Managerial history
 Ziyad Mahmoud
 Saad Al-Dahamshi

See also 
 2020–21 Iraq FA Cup
 2021–22 Iraq FA Cup

References

External links
 Umal Nineveh SC on Goalzz.com
 Iraq Clubs- Foundation Dates

2004 establishments in Iraq
Association football clubs established in 2004
Football clubs in Nineveh